Usue Maitane Arconada (born 28 October 1998) is an American tennis player born in Argentina.

Arconada is the 2016 Wimbledon Championships girls' doubles champion, alongside Claire Liu. In May 2015, she achieved a career-high ITF juniors combined ranking of No. 5. To date, she has won five singles and seven doubles titles on the ITF Circuit.

Performance timelines

Singles

WTA 125 tournament finals

Singles: 1 (runner-up)

Doubles: 2 (runner-ups)

ITF Circuit finals

Singles: 7 (5 titles, 2 runner–ups)

Doubles: 13 (7 titles, 6 runner–ups)

Junior Grand Slam finals

Girls' doubles: 1 (1 title)

External links
 
 

1998 births
Living people
American female tennis players
Tennis players from Buenos Aires
Sportspeople from San Juan, Puerto Rico
Wimbledon junior champions
Grand Slam (tennis) champions in girls' doubles
American people of Argentine descent
American people of Basque descent
Pan American Games medalists in tennis
Pan American Games gold medalists for the United States
Tennis players at the 2019 Pan American Games
Medalists at the 2019 Pan American Games
21st-century American women